Nathan Thompson (born 14 February 1978) is a former Australian rules footballer, who previously played with the Hawthorn and  clubs in the Australian Football League. He has been a previous panellist on the Sunday Footy Show.

Early career
He spent 1997 playing with Hawthorns reserve grade team that accumulated with a reserve grand final appearance. He was one of Hawthorns best that day in a losing side. A tall marking forward, Thompson was an important young player for the club considering he was selected in the 1997 AFL Draft at pick 82.

Hawthorn career

It took time to establish himself, the club was dealing with the end of Jason Dunstalls long career as a spearhead. A strong overhead mark, Thompson seemed to have the kicking yips for pre-game nerves before settling into the rhythm of the game. Once settled he was accurate in front of goal.
Thompson performed well in Hawthorn's 2001 campaign, in which they came within two goals of playing in the Grand Final, and Thompson finished 3rd in the Peter Crimmins Medal. Playing mostly at Full Forward with the occasional run in the ruck, Thompson was the club's leading goalkicker for seasons 2003 and 2004.

Depression
In 2004 Thompson admitted to the media that he had been suffering from clinical depression, a saga that raised awareness of the condition.

North Melbourne career
At the end of 2004, possibly following the need for a fresh start following his revelation of depression, Thompson was a prized recruit for the North Melbourne Football Club and was seen as a big forward option alongside Saverio Rocca at the club. In 2005 he debuted for the Kangaroos and found himself working in rotation and occasionally in tandem with Rocca up forward, although this was not a permanent move due to Rocca's age and the top-heaviness of the Roos' forward line.

2005 season
Thompson was the Kangaroos' leading goalkicker for 2005 with 52 goals and was considered a good choice for the Roos.

One of Thompson's most memorable games was the clash against Collingwood in Round 19. With the Roos trailing by almost 4 goals late in the 4th quarter, Thompson was part of a revival where the Kangaroos managed to take the lead in the dying moments. His contribution was 3 goals, including the matchwinner just before the siren. He gestured with a Hulk Hogan-style fist pump which remained one of the famous images of the 2005 AFL season.

2006 season
In 2006 Thompson faced an eventful two weeks. In the Round 5 game against Melbourne, Thompson had helped the Kangaroos to get back in the game after they were trailing at half-time. Having booted 5 goals for the day and being in control of the Demons' defence, Thompson took a couple of important contested marks and was a dangerous presence up forward for North (in terms of scoring and marking power). He put the Kangaroos in front after they had trailed for much of the last three quarters and was on his way to perhaps putting in a match-winning performance. However following a desperate last-quarter chase of Melbourne's Nathan Carroll, Thompson in a shock move put himself on the bench, replacing himself with Drew Petrie. He was not sitting on the bench and was standing up, giving the impression that he wanted to come back onto the ground. Thompson later cited that he was "spent" and tired as the reasons for his early exit (Melbourne then went on to win the game with a last minute goal after the Kangaroos had several forward opportunities).

This controversy received a lot of media attention but for Sirengate, which occurred the day following the North Melbourne-Melbourne match and was so big that Thompson's voluntary send off (compared to Sally Robbins' rowing controversy by some in the media) was put on the back-burner.

In Round 6 Thompson said that he was willing to put the previous week's debacle aside and performed with an 8-goal haul, the best of his career, to give the Kangaroos a 22-point victory to lift them off the bottom of the ladder.

Glenn Archer wrote an article after Nathan Thompson's taking off incident, from "Thommo's" view, he made a point that Thommo had lactic acid in his legs and he decided it would be better for the team if he swapped with Drew.

2007 season
Thompson was going outstanding in the Pre-Season, with the new fast running attacking ball play ready to give him more of the footy. He kicked a Super Goal against Carlton in the Semi-Finals of the NAB Cup, then, a week later against St Kilda in a Practice Match, Thompson ruptured his ACL and missed the entire 2007 Season.

While in Darwin for the Darwin Cup, Thompson criticised former North Melbourne Football Club champion Wayne Carey about his criticisms of the club, which led Carey to respond with mockery of Thompson's depression on the Nine Network's Sunday morning Footy Show. In addition, on returning from a commercial break, Carey was clearly heard to make references to 'necking himself', to the apparent delight of other members of the Footy Show panel. Carey and the Nine Network were quick to issue an apology over the incident, although no mention was officially made of the 'necking himself' comment.

Thompson has recovered well from his knee injury and was considered a possibility of a return in 2007. His name was thrown around for the round 22 clash against the Western Bulldogs but he didn't end up playing. He also missed out on the finals with coach Laidley saying that he wouldn't risk changing the team's structure that had led to the success they had enjoyed over the season. Thompson will now be looking forward to a big return in 2008.

2008 season
Thompson made his return to football in Round 1 of 2008 against the Bombers on Easter Monday. It was a good return, with Thompson booting 2 goals in the 1st quarter and 3 goals for the 1st half. He kicked 4 goals for the day as the Roos were smashed by the Bombers 9.13.67 to 19.8.122.

Thompson's brilliant effort against Hawthorn in Round 13 earned him an AFL Army Award nomination. The publicly voted Award recognises courage, initiative and teamwork on the footy field. Fans have until 11:59 pm on Sunday, 29 June, to vote for Thompson at afl.com.au

It was announced on The Footy Show that Thompson's career with North Melbourne would be coming to an end.

Thompson officially announced his retirement after being delisted by North Melbourne on 19 September.

Season 2009: Back to VFL
On 24 December 2008, North Melbourne and Hawthorn spearhead Nathan Thompson has decided to come out of retirement and signed with VFL club Werribee Tigers next season after announcing his retirement from AFL ranks this year.
The Tigers, who have a part-time AFL alignment with the Kangaroos in the VFL, were desperate to snare a big forward with stature to replace former captain and this year's J.J. Liston Trophy winner James Podsiadly, who was a shock departure after crossing to Geelong's VFL team.

Post AFL/VFL Career
Thompson played for the Doncaster Football Club in Division 3 of the Eastern Football League and kicked 9 goals in the 2013 Grand Final against Wantirna South. In 2016 he returned to his home town of Kyneton in central Victoria to play for the Kyneton Tigers.

Statistics
 Statistics are correct to the end of 2021.

|- style=background:#EAEAEA
| 1997 ||  || 49
| 0 || — || — || — || — || — || — || — || — || — || — || — || — || — || — || — || — || 0
|-
| 1998 ||  || 49
| 2 || — || — || 3 || 1 || 4 || — || — || — || 0.0 || 0.0 || 1.5 ||0.5 || 2.0 || 0.0 || — || — || 0
|- style=background:#EAEAEA
| 1999 ||  || 16
| 18 || 23 || 21 || 114|| 57 || 171 || 75 || 9 || 131 || 1.3 || 1.1 || 6.3 || 3.2 || 9.5 || 4.2 || 0.5 || 7.3 || 4
|-
| 2000 ||  || 16
| 22 || 39 || 19 || 155 || 64 || 219 || 106 || 9 || 92 || 1.8 || 0.9 || 7.1 || 2.9 || 10.0 || 4.8 || 0.4 || 4.2 || 1
|- style=background:#EAEAEA
| 2001 ||  || 23
| 25 || 30 || 27 || 235 || 114 || 349 || 155 || 30 || 185 || 1.2 || 1.1 || 9.4 || 4.6 || 14.0 || 6.2 || 3.2 || 23.2 || 5
|-
| 2002 ||  || 23
| 18 || 26 || 17 || 132 || 61 || 193 || 85 || 22 || 120 || 1.4 || 0.9 || 7.3 || 3.4 || 10.7 || 4.7 || 2.6 || 21.4 || 5
|- style=background:#EAEAEA
| 2003 ||  || 23
| 15 || 38 || 15 || 118 || 46 || 164 || 91 || 18 || 103 || 2.5 || 1.0 || 7.9 || 3.1 || 11.0 || 6.1 || 0.8 || 3.26 || 2
|-
| 2004 ||  || 23
| 19 || 36 || 20 || 135 || 54 || 189 || 89 || 16 || 62 || 1.9 || 1.1 || 8.2 || 1.7 || 9.9 || 6.0 || 1.8 || 21.7 || 3
|- style=background:#EAEAEA
| 2005 ||  || 23
| 23 || 52 || 29 || 189 || 39 || 228 || 138 || 14 || 40 || 2.3 || 1.3 || 8.2 || 1.7 || 9.9 || 6.0 || 0.6 || 1.7 || 8
|-
| 2006||  || 23
| 22 || 54 || 40 || 192 || 43 || 235 || 152 || 24 || 5 || 2.5 || 1.8 || 8.7 || 1.9 || 10.6 || 6.9 || 1.1 || 0.2 || 13
|- style=background:#EAEAEA
| 2007 ||  || 23
| 0 || — || — || — || — || — || — || — || — || — || — || — || — || — || — || — || — || 0
|-
| 2008 ||  || 23
| 15 || 29 || 13 || 92 || 36 || 128 || 67 || 21 || 12 || 1.9 || 0.9 || 6.1 || 2.4 || 8.5 || 4.5 || 1.4 || 0.8 || 2
|- class="sortbottom"
! colspan=3| Career
! 179 !! 327 !! 201 !! 1365 !! 515 !! 1880 !! 958 !! 163 !! 750 !! 1.8 !! 1.1 !! 7.6 !! 2.9 !! 10.5 !! 5.3 !! 0.9 !! 4.2 !! 43
|}

References

 http://www.realfooty.com.au/news/news/werribee-gets-signature/2008/12/23/1229998527451.html

External links

1978 births
Living people
Australian rules footballers from Victoria (Australia)
Hawthorn Football Club players
North Melbourne Football Club players
Bendigo Pioneers players
Kyneton Football Club players